The Salem Capitals are an American professional basketball team based out of Salem, Oregon, and a member of The Basketball League (TBL). They play their home games in the Salem Armory, which seats 3,000 for basketball.

History
On December 6, 2020, Evelyn Magley, CEO of The Basketball League (TBL), stated that Salem, Oregon, was approved as a basketball franchise with Jason Conrad the inaugural team owner. The Capitals opted to sit out the 2021 season due to the COVID-19 pandemic.

2022 Season 
On March 4, 2022, the team's inaugural season began with a 116-100 win over the Vancouver Volcanoes. They went on to win their next seven consecutive games before a 127-125 loss to the California Sea-Kings on April 1. They finished the regular-season with a record of 20-7, good for third place in the West Conference. They swept the Vancouver Volcanoes in the First Round of the playoffs and then fell to the California Sea-Kings during the West Conference Semi-Finals in a best two out of three series.

Player Awards 
Montigo Alford - All West Conference Second Team, Averaged 19.8 points and 4.4 assists per game.

Vincent Bowman -  TBL All-Star,  All West Conference First Team, Averaged 24.4 points and 10.8 rebounds per game.

Dominique Lawrence - TBL "Spirit of the Game Award" winner for his commitment to the fans and the community.

Current roster

References

The Basketball League teams
Sports teams in Salem, Oregon
Basketball teams established in 2020
2020 establishments in Oregon
 Basketball teams in Oregon